Ashnaabad (also Romanized as Āshnāābād) is a village in Rowzeh Chay Rural District, in the Central District of Urmia County, West Azerbaijan Province, Iran. At the 2006 census, its population was 335, in 100 families. This village is populated by Azerbaijani Turks.

References 

Populated places in Urmia County